Brigadier-General Edmund William Costello, VC, CMG, CVO, DSO (7 August 1873 – 7 June 1949) was a British Indian Army officer and a recipient of the Victoria Cross, the highest and most prestigious award for gallantry in the face of the enemy that can be awarded to British and Commonwealth forces.

Early life and service
Costello was born in Sheikhbudia on the North-West Frontier of India, the son of a colonel in the Indian Medical Service. He was educated in England at Beaumont College, Stonyhurst College and the Royal Military College, Sandhurst. In 1892 he was commissioned into the West Yorkshire Regiment, but transferred to the Indian Army in 1894 and was posted to the 22nd Punjab Infantry.

Victoria Cross
He was 23 years old, and attached to the 24th Punjab Infantry during the Malakand Frontier War, when the following deed took place for which he was awarded the VC:

In the subsequent fighting he was wounded twice and mentioned in dispatches twice.

Later service
In November 1900 Costello was appointed adjutant of his regiment, and on 19 November 1901 he was promoted Captain in the Indian Staff Corps. He then worked as a recruiting officer for several years before taking part in the Mohmand operations of 1908. He was promoted Major in 1910. In 1913 he entered the Indian Staff College at Quetta and graduated just before the outbreak of the First World War in 1914, when he rejoined his regiment as second-in-command.

The regiment was soon sent to Mesopotamia as part of the 17th (Ahmednagar) Brigade of the 6th (Poona) Division and Costello remained there for the rest of the war. He was promoted Brevet Lieutenant-Colonel in June 1916, was awarded the Distinguished Service Order (DSO) in 1917 and appointed Companion of the Order of St Michael and St George (CMG) in 1918. In May 1918 he took command of the 12th Indian Brigade and he received a substantive promotion to Lieutenant-Colonel in September 1918. He was mentioned five times in dispatches during the war and also received the French Croix de Guerre.

In June 1919 he was promoted Brevet Colonel and was joint commander of the Indian contingent at the Peace March in London, for which he was appointed Commander of the Royal Victorian Order (CVO) in the 1920 New Year Honours. He was promoted substantive Colonel in March 1920, although he had held the acting appointment of Brigadier-General since 1918. From May to December 1920 he commanded the 8th (Jullundur) Brigade in the 3rd (Lahore) Division. In March 1921 he went to Palestine as temporary commander of the Palestine Defence Force and remained there to command a brigade in 1922. He retired in October 1923 and became Director of Military Studies at the University of Cambridge.

Family
Costello married Elise Maud Lang Huggins, daughter of Charles Lang Huggins, of Hadlow Grange, Buxted, Sussex, at St Peter and St Edward's church, Pimlico, on 16 October 1902.

Legacy
His grave and headstone memorial is at St Mark's Church, Hadlow Down, Sussex, England.

His Victoria Cross is displayed at the National Army Museum in Chelsea.

Honours and awards

Footnotes

References
Obituary, The Times, 9 June 1949
Richard Doherty & David Truesdale, Irish Winners of the Victoria Cross, 2000
David Harvey, Monuments to Courage, 1999
The Register of the Victoria Cross, This England, 1997

External links
Location of grave and VC medal

1873 births
1949 deaths
People from Khyber Pakhtunkhwa
Indian Army generals of World War I
British recipients of the Victoria Cross
People educated at Stonyhurst College
Graduates of the Royal Military College, Sandhurst
West Yorkshire Regiment officers
British military personnel of the Malakand Frontier War
Recipients of the Croix de Guerre 1914–1918 (France)
Companions of the Distinguished Service Order
Companions of the Order of St Michael and St George
Commanders of the Royal Victorian Order
Academics of the University of Cambridge
British people in colonial India